NGC 391 is an unbarred lenticular galaxy located in the constellation Cetus. It was discovered on January 8, 1853 by George Bond. It was described by Dreyer as "faint, small, mottled but not resolved (Auwers 9)."

References

External links
 

0391
18530108
Cetus (constellation)
Unbarred lenticular galaxies
003976